Sonora State Highway 100 (Carretera Estatal 100) is a highway in the center of the Mexican state of Sonora.

It runs from Hermosillo to El Desemboque, connecting also the beach town of Bahía de Kino.

References

100